Horisme incana is a moth in the family Geometridae first described by Louis W. Swett in 1917. It is found in North America.

The MONA or Hodges number for Horisme incana is 7446.

References

Further reading

External links

 

Melanthiini
Articles created by Qbugbot
Moths described in 1917